Jakobids are an order of free-living, heterotrophic, flagellar eukaryotes in the supergroup Excavata. They are small (less than 15 μm), and can be found in aerobic and anaerobic environments. The order Jakobida, believed to be monophyletic, consists of only twenty species at present, and was classified as a group in 1993. There is ongoing research into the mitochondrial genomes of jakobids, which are unusually large and bacteria-like, evidence that jakobids may be important to the evolutionary history of eukaryotes.

Molecular phylogenetic evidence suggests strongly that jakobids are most closely related to Heterolobosea (Percolozoa) and Euglenozoa.

Structure and Biology
Jakobids have two flagella, inserted in the anterior end of the cell, and, like other members of order Excavata, have a ventral feeding groove and associated cytoskeleton support. The posterior flagella has a dorsal vane and is aligned within the ventral groove, where it generates a current that the cell uses for food intake.
 The nucleus is generally in the anterior part of the cell and bears a nucleolus. Most known jakobids have one mitochondrion, again located anteriorly, and different genera have flattened, tubular, or absent cristae. Food vacuoles are mostly located on the cell posterior, and in most jakobids the endoplasmic reticulum is distributed throughout the cell.

The sessile, loricate Histionidae and occasionally free-swimming Jakoba libera (Jakobidae) have extrusomes under the dorsal membrane that are theorized to be defensive structures.

Ecology
Jakobids are widely dispersed, having been found in soil, freshwater, and marine habitats, but generally not common. However, environmental DNA surveys suggest that Stygiellidae are abundant in anoxic marine habitats. Some are capable of surviving hypersaline and anoxic environments, though the Histionids have only been found in freshwater ecosystems, where they attach themselves to algae or zooplankton. Outside of obligate sessile species, many species of jakobids can attach temporarily to surfaces, using either of the two flagella or the cell body itself.

All known jakobids are heterotrophic suspension feeders. Their primary prey is generally considered to be bacteria, though one species has been observed eating extremely small (< 1 µm) eukaryotic cells. Jakobids are generally slow swimmers, with low clearance rates relative to similar organisms.

No study has suggested jakobids might be pathogenic or toxic.

Mitochondrial DNA
Since jakobids have no current commercial use, most research into jakobids has focused on their evolutionary significance. The mitochondrial DNA of jakobids is the most bacteria-like of all known eukaryotic mitochondrial DNA, suggesting that jakobid mitochondrial genomes might approximate the ancestral mitochondrial genome.

Jakobid mitochondrial DNA is substantially different from most other eukaryotes, especially in terms of the number of genes (nearly 100 in some species) and bacteria-like elements within their genomes. Nine of the genes have never been found in eukaryotic mitochondrial DNA. Uniquely, jakobid mitochondrial genomes code for bacteria-type RNA polymerase, as opposed to typical eukaryotic mitochondrial RNA polymerase, referred to as “phage-type”, which appears to be viral in origin. This does not necessarily mean that jakobids are basal to the phylogeny of eukaryotes. While jakobid mitochondria have genetic features that seem to have developed from bacteria, and apparently lack phage-type RNA, it is possible that other eukaryotic clades lost their bacterial features independently.

Several proposed possibilities might explain the bacterial features of jakobid mitochondrial DNA. One is that jakobids diverged very early from the rest of the eukaryotes. This hypothesis depends on whether or not jakobids are indeed basal to all living eukaryotes, but there is no evidence yet to support that suggestion.

Another hypothesis is that the phage-type RNA polymerase moved from one eukaryote group to another via lateral gene transfer, replacing the bacteria-type enzyme, and simply did not reach the jakobids. This would not depend on jakobids being basal to eukaryotes as a whole, but has not been widely studied.

A third possibility is the reverse of the others, suggesting that the phage-type RNA polymerase is the basal one. Under this scenario, jakobids acquired their bacteria-type RNA polymerase much more recently and that then spread via lateral gene transfer. However, the gene arrangement of jakobid mitochondrial DNA suggests an ancestral origin of bacteria-type RNA polymerase over a more-recent divergence.

One of the proposed scenarios suggests that the common ancestor of eukaryotes had two mitochondrial RNA polymerases, both phage-type and bacteria-type, and jakobids lost their phage-type polymerase while the rest of the eukaryotes lost the bacteria-type, possibly several times. Such a model eliminates the need for jakobids to be truly basal. One study proposed that the phage-type and bacteria-type polymerases, when present in the same mitochondrion, served different functions, much in the way that the organelles of land plants have two different RNA polymerase enzymes that transcribe different genes.

Taxonomy
Jakobida contains five families consisting of mostly free-swimming genera: Jakobidae, Moramonadidae, Andaluciidae, and Stygiellidae. The sixth family, Histionidae, is largely populated by sessile loricate genera, and includes the first jakobids ever described.

Jakobids are a monophyletic group, and are most closely related to the Euglenozoa and Heterolobosea.

 Class Jakobea Cavalier-Smith 1999
 Order Jakobida Cavalier-Smith 1993
 Suborder Ophirinina Yabuki et al. 2018
 Family Ophirinidae Yabuki et al. 2018
 Genus Ophirina Yabuki et al. 2018
 Species Ophirina amphinema Yabuki et al. 2018
 Suborder Andaluciina Cavalier-Smith 2013
 Family Andaluciidae Cavalier-Smith 2013
 Genus Andalucia Lara et al. 2006
 Species Andalucia godoyi Lara et al. 2006
 Family Stygiellidae Pánek, Táborský & Čepička 2015
 Genus Velundella Pánek, Táborský & Čepička 2015
 Species  V. nauta Pánek, Táborský & Čepička 2015
 Species  V. trypanoides Pánek, Táborský & Čepička 2015
 Genus Stygiella Pánek, Táborský & Čepička 2015 non Bruand 1853
 Species  S. incarcerata (Bernard, Simpson & Patterson 2000) Pánek, Táborský & Čepička 2015 [Jakoba incarcerata Bernard, Simpson & Patterson 2000; Andalucia incarcerata (Bernard, Simpson & Patterson 2000) Lara et al. 2006]
 Species  S. agilis Pánek, Táborský & Čepička 2015
 Species  S. cryptica Pánek, Táborský & Čepička 2015
 Species  S. adhaerens Pánek, Táborský & Čepička 2015
 Suborder Histonina Cavalier-Smith 1993
 Species ?Jakoba echidna O'Kelly 1991
 Family Moramonadidae Strassert et al. 2016
 Genus Moramonas Strassert et al. 2016
 Species Moramonas marocensis Strassert et al. 2016
 Genus Seculamonas Marx et al. 2003 nomen nudum
 Species Seculamonas ecuadoriensis Marx et al. 2003 nomen nudum
 Family Jakobidae Patterson 1990
 Genus Jakoba Patterson 1990
 Species Jakoba bahamiensis Burger & Lang (indeitum)
 Species Jakoba libera (Ruinen 1938) Patterson 1990 [Cryptobia libera Ruinen 1938]
 Family Histionidae Flavin & Nerad 1993
 Genus Histiona Voigt 1902 [Zachariasia Voigt 1901 non Lemmermann 1895]
 Species ?H. planctonica Scourfield 1937
 Species H. aroides Pascher 1943
 Species H. velifera (Voigt 1901) Pascher 1943 [Zachariasia velifera Voigt 1901; Histiona zachariasii Voigt 1901 nom. illeg.]
 Genus Reclinomonas Flavin & Nerad 1993
 Species R. americana Flavin & Nerad 1993
 Species R. campanula (Penard 1921) Flavin & Nerad 1993 [Histiona campanula Penard 1921; Stenocodon campanula (Penard 1921) Pascher 1942]
 Genus Stenocodon Pascher 1942
 Species Stenocodon epiplankton Pascher 1942
 Genus Stomatochone Pascher 1942
 Species S. infundibuliformis Pascher 1942
 Species S. cochlear Pascher 1942
 Species S. excavata Pascher 1942
 Species S. epiplankton Pascher 1942

See also
Loukozoa

References